Out for Blood is the fifth album by the American thrash metal band Sadus. It was released on February 27, 2006 by Mascot Records.

Track listing
CD1
"In the Name of..." – 6:10
"No More" – 4:51
"Smackdown" – 4:22
"Out for Blood" – 4:44
"Lost It All" – 4:38
"Sick" – 4:39
"Down" – 3:40
"Freedom" – 6:58
"Freak" – 2:57
"Cursed" – 8:10
"Crazy" – 5:40

CD2
"Black March" (Re-Recorded Version) – 4:59
"Invaders" (Re-Recorded Version 2000) (Iron Maiden cover) – 3:22
"Merciless Death" (Dark Angel cover) – 4:16

Personnel
Sadus
Darren Travis – guitar, vocals
Steve Di Giorgio – bass, keyboards
Jon Allen – drums

Production
Børge Finstad – producer
Juan Urteaga – engineer
Rob Lewis – manager

References

2006 albums
Sadus albums
Mascot Records albums
Technical death metal albums